George Dockrell (22 October 1886 – 23 December 1924) was an Olympic swimmer, best known for competing at the 1908 Summer Olympics in the men's 100 metre freestyle event for Great Britain. He had a lengthy swimming, and military career, until his death in 1924.

Early and family life

He was born William Robert to Maurice Edward Dockrell and Margaret Dockrell on 22 October 1886 in Dublin, Ireland but he was later baptised George Shannon Dockrell. He came from a prominent political family in Dublin. Sir Maurice Edward Dockrell was a Unionist Politician and was one of the few members who took his seat in the British House of Commons after the 1918 Irish General Election. His mother, Lady Margaret Dockrell (née Shannon) was a suffragette, who actively campaigned for women's rights, and was a member of Dublin City Council. They were married in 1875 and eventually both his parents worked in the family business of Thomas Dockrell, Sons and Co. Ltd.

Growing up he lived Blackrock, Co. Dublin with six siblings, a sister named Anna and five brothers Thomas, Kenneth, Maurice, Henry and James. His family was raised Protestant, within the Church of Ireland. His family was also heavily involved in the Dublin Swimming Club, where George won 21 out of the 38 titles won by the Dockrell family. Dockrell spent his school years, from 1899 to 1903 in Trent College, Nottingham where he excelled at swimming. In 1904 he sailed from Liverpool to New York aboard the ship Celtic under the name Geo. S Dockrell. He lived in America for two years where he was inspired by the technique of American Olympic swimmer, C.M. Daniels. Upon his return to Ireland he received his education at Trinity College Dublin.

Several of Dockrell's siblings went to work alongside their parents at Thomas Dockrell, Sons and Co. Ltd. While his brother Henry became a Fine Gael T.D. Meanwhile, Dockrell became more actively involved in his own swimming career. His niece, Marguerite Dockrell, and nephew, Hayes Dockrell, also went on to compete in the 1928 Summer Olympics in Amsterdam. Like Dockrell, his niece competed in swimming, while his nephew took part in the water polo section.

References

External links
 

1886 births
1924 deaths
British male swimmers
Olympic swimmers of Great Britain
Swimmers at the 1908 Summer Olympics
Place of birth missing
Irish male swimmers